William J. Gedney (April 4, 1915November 14, 1999) was an American linguist notable for his work on Thai and related Tai languages.

Life
Gedney was born in Orchards, Washington, and spent his childhood there. He was the son of John Marshall Gedney and Viola Gedney (nee Woster), the descendants of English immigrants. Gedney's father died of pneumonia in 1918, when Gedney was three years old. In 1935, Gedney graduated magna cum laude from Whitman College. After graduation, Gedney lived in Leavenworth, Washington and worked as a high school English teacher. During the summers, he occupied himself seriously with linguistics. After the outbreak of the Second World War, he was drafted into the army in August 1942 and assigned to the Army Language Unit in New York City, where he began to work with the Thai language. During this period in New York he also began doctoral studies in Sanskrit at Yale University as a student of Franklin Edgerton. He completed his PhD in 1947, with the dissertation Indic Loanwords in Spoken Thai. He then  moved to Thailand, where he studied Thai language and literature, working with some of the most important scholars of the country. He met Choy Manachip, a native of Ayutthaya Province, there in Thailand, and they wed in 1953. Mrs. Gedney was one of the native speakers of Thai consulted for the Thai grammars written by Richard B. Noss (1954, expanded 1964). Gedney was professor of linguistics at the University of Ceylon 1959–60, then in 1960 took a position teaching linguistics and Thai at the University of Michigan in Ann Arbor, where he was in the English department until a department of linguistics was formed there in 1963. In his early years at Michigan, he helped develop the first Thai language training program for the Peace Corps.

Gedney taught at the University of Michigan until his retirement in 1980, and served as chair of the linguistics department from 1972–75. During his career, Gedney was active in the Linguistic Society of America, the American Oriental Society, the Siam Society, the Association for Asian Studies and Southeast Asian Linguistics Society. In 1981, he served as vice president of the American Oriental Society, and in 1982 as president.

During his years of study Gedney began collecting Thai literature, ultimately building a 14,000 volume collection, which he donated in 1975 to the University of Michigan. Gedney specialized throughout his career on documenting the Tai–Kadai languages. He sought in particular many in the less spoken languages of this family in Southeast Asia and southern China in order to capture the characteristics of these languages. He was known for the accuracy of his notes on the tonal and phonological characteristics of these languages, and developed important word lists and representations for the study and comparisons of their tone.

In all Gedney worked on over 22 languages, including Saek, Lue, and Yay, often creating the first dictionaries of those languages. His findings have been published in an eight-volume series with the Center for South and South East Asian Studies at the University of Michigan, edited by Thomas John Hudak, one of Gedney's students.

By focusing on data and his extensive knowledge of the Tai–Kadai languages, Gedney established himself as a leader in the comparative-historical study of Tai languages and dialects. But his influence went far beyond linguistics. Researchers from other disciplines including history, political science, art history and anthropology sought his advice.

William J. Gedney died on 14 November 1999 in Ann Arbor, Michigan.

Students
Gedney advised many dissertations in Tai linguistics, and made his extensive field notes available to his students. He continued to serve on dissertation committees after his retirement in 1980. A selection of Gedney's notable students and their dissertations is as follows:

Publications

Selected Papers on Comparative Tai Studies
Published in 1989, Selected Papers on Comparative Tai Studies collected together fourteen of Gedney's most important papers:

Future Directions in Comparative Tai Linguistics
On the Thai Evidence for Austro-Thai
A Spectrum of Phonological Features in Tai
A Checklist for Determining Tones in Tai Dialects
Speculations on Early Tai Tones
Evidence for Another Series of Voiced Initials in Proto-Tai
A Puzzle in Comparative Tai Phonology
Notes on Tai Nuea
The Saek Language of Nakhon Phanom Province
Yay, a Northern Tai Language in North Vietnam
A Comparative Sketch of White, Black and Red Tai
A Siamese Innovation
Special Vocabularies in Thai
Siamese Verse Forms in Historical Perspective

Other papers

Publications by Thomas John Hudak
Much of Gedney's work on Tai languages was published by his student Thomas John Hudak:

Festschrifts
Four festschrifts were published in Gedney's honor:

References

1915 births
1999 deaths
20th-century linguists
Historical linguists
Linguists from the United States
Linguists of Thai
University of Michigan faculty